Ulla Koivuranta (born 19 March 1959, in Vaasa, Finland) is a Finnish actress.

In 1991 she began work at the Turku Theatre.

She played the role of Lempi in the 1994 film Aapo.

Filmography
Hyvän tekijät (1997), released as Good Deeds in the USA, as Nainen työvoimatoimistossa
Viisasten kivi (1996) .... Salli
Lipton Cockton in the Shadows of Sodoma (1995), as Lipton Cockton (Finland: short title), as Irma
Aapo (1994) .... Lempi
Back to the USSR – takaisin Ryssiin (1992) .... Molla Elo
Linna (1986)
Fakta homma .... Nainen terassilla (1 episode, 1986) - Kuoro ja kapakka (1986)

References

External links

1959 births
Living people
People from Vaasa
Finnish film actresses
Finnish television actresses
20th-century Finnish actresses